Jan Phyl Village is a census-designated place (CDP) in Polk County, Florida, United States. The population was 5,633 at the 2000 census. It is part of the Lakeland–Winter Haven Metropolitan Statistical Area.

History
Jan Phyl Village was formed from a purchase in 1950 of 1,200 acres of land west of Winter Haven, purchased by Harry Lesnick of Vermont. He christened the area Jan Phyl Village after his daughters, Janet and Phyllis Lesnick. Most of the early development was real estate, sold to airmen and pilot instructors stationed at the nearby Bartow Air Base during the Korean War. The area suffered its first recession in 1953 at the cessation of U.S. military activity in Korea, leading to many homes being foreclosed. The area remains economically depressed as of 2014, with many closed storefronts. If a proposed transportation improvement program planned by the Polk Transportation Planning Organization is approved, major thoroughfares in the area will be widened by 2030 to accommodate additional traffic.

Geography
Jan Phyl Village is located at  (28.017059, -81.777810).

Demographics

As of the census of 2000, there were 5,633 people, 1,947 households, and 1,573 families residing in the CDP. The racial makeup of the CDP was 75.84% White, 16.90% African American, 0.23% Native American, 1.95% Asian, 2.34% from other races, and 2.73% from two or more races. Hispanic or Latino of any race were 7.01% of the population.

There were 1,947 households, out of which 41.6% had children under the age of 18 living with them, 60.6% were married couples living together, 15.2% had a female householder with no husband present, and 19.2% were non-families. 14.8% of all households were made up of individuals, and 5.9% had someone living alone who was 65 years of age or older.  The average household size was 2.89 and the average family size was 3.17.

In the CDP, the population was spread out, with 30.0% under the age of 18, 9.5% from 18 to 24, 29.5% from 25 to 44, 22.2% from 45 to 64, and 8.9% who were 65 years of age or older.  The median age was 33 years. For every 100 females, there were 90.9 males.  For every 100 females age 18 and over, there were 89.1 males.

The median income for a household in the CDP was $41,219, and the median income for a family was $45,958. Males had a median income of $30,117 versus $21,072 for females. The per capita income for the CDP was $16,389.  About 5.6% of families and 8.5% of the population were below the poverty line, including 14.9% of those under age 18 and 1.8% of those age 65 or over.

References

Census-designated places in Polk County, Florida
Census-designated places in Florida
Populated places established in 1950